Dera Baba Nanak Assembly constituency (Sl. No.: 10) is a Punjab Legislative Assembly constituency in Gurdaspur district, Punjab state, India.

Members of Legislative Assembly

Election results

2022

2017

2012

2007

2002

1985

1980

1977

1972

1969

1967

1962

1957

1951

References

External links
  

Assembly constituencies of Punjab, India
Gurdaspur district